

1919–20 season

Schedule and results

1920–21 season

Schedule and results

1921–22 season

Schedule and results

1922–23 season

Schedule and results

1923–24 season

Schedule and results

1924–25 season

Schedule and results

1925–26 season

Schedule and results

1926–27 season

Schedule and results

1927–28 season

Schedule and results

1928–29 season

Schedule and results

References

1920